Cynthia K. Sakai (born March 13, 1982) is a Japanese American jewelry designer and founder of design company Vita Fede.

Early life 
Sakai was born and raised in California. Her mother worked in luxury fashion and her father worked as an architect.

Career 
Sakai launched her first accessories line, Girlboy by Koco, at the age of 18.

At the age of 21, she started a multiline showroom in Los Angeles and worked as actress.

Vita Fede 
After she received a handcrafted bracelet from Florence, she traveled to Italy to find and meet the local artisan. She was inspired and founded Vita Fede in 2009. The brand's products are made in Italy and distributed throughout Europe, Asia, South America, Canada and the Middle East. In 2014, Sakai became a member of the Council of Fashion Designers of America.

References

American jewelry designers
Living people
1982 births
American people of Japanese descent
Women jewellers